Logan Fontaine (born 25 March 1999) is a French open water swimmer.

He competed in the 5 km open water event at the 2018 European Aquatics Championships, winning the bronze medal.

References

1999 births
Living people
French male long-distance swimmers
French male freestyle swimmers
European Aquatics Championships medalists in swimming
World Aquatics Championships medalists in open water swimming
Medalists at the FINA World Swimming Championships (25 m)
20th-century French people
21st-century French people